Folmar of Karden (ca. 1135 – 1189), also occurring in the variant forms Fulmar, Vollmar, Volcmar, Formal, or Formator, was the Archbishop of Trier from 1183 and the last not also to be a prince elector. He opposed the emperor in the late twelfth-century phase of the Investiture Controversy. The historian Bernhard von Simson characterized Folmar as "that restless, ambitious, and hard-hearted man."

Biography

Early career 
Possibly a relation of the Counts of Bliescastel, Folmar was provost in the city of Karden on the Moselle, and became an archdeacon in Trier and Metz.

Election 
On the death on May 25, 1183 of the previous archbishop, the pro-Staufen Arnold I, the succession came into dispute between Folmar, the candidate of the pro-papal party, Henry III, Duke of Limburg (the Vogt of the church of Trier) and other local nobles, the citizens, and the smaller part of the clergy; and the Provost of Trier, Rudolf of Wied, the candidate favored by the emperor Frederick Barbarossa and the greater part of the canons and prelates present for the election. After a certain amount of intriguing by various factions, Folmar was elected archbishop by a part of the cathedral chapter and by popular acclaim in 1183; Lucius III somewhat dubiously ratified the election after the Synod of Verona. Nevertheless, the Emperor had Rudolf formally invested as anti-archbishop. Folmar proceeded to Italy, where the case was argued inconclusively before the Roman Curia.  At length, Folmar was consecrated by Pope Urban III in Verona on Whit-Sunday (June 1) of 1186.

Dispute 
He hastened to return in disguise from Italy, pausing in Toul, where Bishop Peter of Brixey, a suffragan of Trier and an adherent of Barbarossa's, refused to receive him; he fared better with Bishop Bertram of Metz, who received him as his metropolitan with a solemn procession. Unable to proceed to Trier, which was held by the adherents of Rudolf, Folmar set out for his erstwhile home in the Abbey of Saint-Pierremont in Avril, then in the territory of Count Theobald I of Bar; thence he immediately began to issue edicts against Rudolf and his supporters. Strife arose in the bishopric between the followers of Folmar and Rudolf, to the point that Philip II of France had to obtain from Barbarossa the release of a French Cistercian who had been transmitting Folmar's letters on the condition that no such messengers would be allowed to leave France again.  Folmar's claim was strengthened by the support of the Archbishop of Köln, Philip of Heinsberg, who erected a fortress in Zeltingen to that purpose, and by Folmar's appointment to the position of Papal legate.  In 1187, Folmar called a provincial synod in Mouzon, which duly pronounced the excommunications of Peter of Brixey and Bishop Henry of Verdun. (These excommunications were nullified by a bull of Gregory VIII issued on 30 November 1187.) Armed clashes between the two factions became common, and it was said that the violence in the diocese was a fulfillment of the baleful prophecies of Hildegard of Bingen.

Exile, Deposition, and Death 
Folmar proceeded to France, until through the influence of Barbarossa he was expelled by Philip Augustus, and then departed to the Angevin territory of Henry II of England, where he was received and honorably maintained at the royal expense in the Augustinian Priory of St. Cosmas at La Riche near Tours; on 7 July 1189 he took part in Henry's sepulture at Fontevraud Abbey and departed thence to London, where, according to Roger of Hoveden's Chronicle, "Formalis Treverensis archiepiscopus" was among those prelates concelebrating the coronation of King Richard I of England on September 3, 1189, subsequently (September 15-16) attending a royal council at Pipewell. In view of the devastation of the archbishopric and the fact that neither he nor his competitor Rudolf ever gained full possession of the see, both had been deprived by Pope Clement III in a papal bull of June 26, 1189; Folmar died the same year, still in exile, at Northampton.  The schism was ended in 1190 with the consecration of John, Archdeacon of Speyer and Provost of the monastery of St. Germain, as John I.

In popular culture
Folmar is among a number of historical characters depicted in the 2013 German historical novel, Das Salz der Erde by Christoph Lode (writing under the name "Daniel Wolf").

Footnotes

References
 Heinrich Beyer, Leopold Eltester, & Adam Goerz (1860–1873), Mittelrheinisches Urkundenbuch (MRUB), Band II, Koblenz, pp. 130–132. Available  on Google Books here:Vol. 2. (in German and Latin).
   (in German)
 (in German)
 , available at the Internet Archive here: Volume VI. (in German)
 Lode, Christoph (as Daniel Wolf) Das Salz der Erde ("The Salt of the Earth"). Goldmann, Munich 2013, 
  (in German)
 
 Concilia Germaniæ  (ed. Johann Friedrich Schannat and Joseph Hartzmann, S.J.) (11 fol. vols., 1759–90). Cologne, 1760. (Full text available at Google Books Volume 3.: Ab Anno M. Ad MCCXC.) (in Latin)
 Chronica Magistri Rogeri de Hovedene (ed. William Stubbs) (4 vols., Rolls series, 1868–71), available at the Internet Archive here: Volume 3. (in Latin)
 Gesta Regis Henrici Secundi Benedicti Abbatis (ed. William Stubbs) (2 vols., Rolls series, 1868–71), available at Google Books here: Volume 2. (in Latin)
 Gesta Trevirorum (ed. Johann Hugo Wyttenbach and Franz Joseph Müller)  (8 vols.), available at the Internet Archive here: Volume 1. (in Latin)
 Folmar von Karden in den Saarländischen Biografien  (in German)

1130s births
1189 deaths
Archbishops of Trier
12th-century Roman Catholic archbishops in the Holy Roman Empire
Year of birth uncertain